Franziska Volkmann (born 4 April 1994) is a German badminton player. She won bronze medals at the 2013 European Junior Championships in the mixed doubles and team events.

Achievements

European Junior Championships 
Mixed doubles

BWF International Challenge/Series (2 runners-up) 
Women's doubles

Mixed doubles

  BWF International Challenge tournament
  BWF International Series tournament
  BWF Future Series tournament

References

External links 
 

1994 births
Living people
People from Mölln, Schleswig-Holstein
Sportspeople from Schleswig-Holstein
German female badminton players